Eric is a common given name.

Eric, Erik, Erich, or Erick may also refer to:

Fiction

 Eric (novel), a 1990 Discworld novel by Terry Pratchett
 Eric, or, Little by Little, an 1858 novel by Frederic W. Farrar

Mononym
 Erik (Vietnamese singer)
 Erik (British singer)
 Erik (wrestler), American professional wrestler
 Eric (footballer, born 1977)
 Eric (footballer, born 1989)
 Erik (footballer, born 1994)
 Erik (footballer, born 1995)
 Erik (footballer, born 2001)

Places
 Erich, Uttar Pradesh, a town and nagar panchayat in Jhansi district, Uttar Pradesh, India
 Erick, Oklahoma, second westernmost town in Beckham County, Oklahoma, United States

Other
 Eric (robot), a robot built in 1928
 Eric (software), a free integrated-development environment
 4954 Eric, an asteroid
 , a West German cargo ship
 Tropical Storm Erick, a list of tropical cyclones
 Electronic Registration Information Center (ERIC), a multi-state shared database of voter registration data in the US
 Education Resources Information Center (ERIC), an online digital library of education research and information
 European Research Infrastructure Consortium (ERIC), a legal entity in the European Union
 Ericsson, Swedish telecommunications company (stock ticker ERIC)
 Erik (HBC vessel), a propeller driven steamship
 Erik (The Phantom of the Opera), the title character from Gaston Leroux's 1910 novel Le Fantôme de l'Opéra
 Erik (album), a 2004 album by Erik Rubin

See also
 Ericsson (disambiguation)